Mother-in-Law's Coming (Swedish: Svärmor kommer) is a 1932 Swedish comedy film directed by Paul Merzbach and starring Karin Swanström, Nils Wahlbom and Magda Holm. It was shot at the Råsunda Studios in Stockholm. The film's sets were designed by the art director Arne Åkermark. It is based on the West End stage farce My Wife's Family by Fred Duprez.

Cast
 Karin Swanström as Mother-in-law
 Nils Wahlbom as 	Abel
 Magda Holm as Ulla Berggren
 Adolf Jahr as 	John Berggren
 Annalisa Ericson as Maggie 
 Sture Lagerwall as 	Olle
 Erik Berglund as 	Adelfors 
 Maritta Marke as 	Dolly Deje
 Birgitta Hede as Sally, maid

References

Bibliography 
 Larsson, Mariah & Marklund, Anders. Swedish Film: An Introduction and Reader. Nordic Academic Press, 2010.

External links 
 

1932 films
1932 comedy films
Swedish comedy films
1930s Swedish-language films
Swedish black-and-white films
Films directed by Paul Merzbach
Swedish films based on plays
Remakes of British films
1930s Swedish films